Acropogon veillonii is a species of flowering plant in the family Malvaceae. It is found only in New Caledonia.

References

veillonii
Endemic flora of New Caledonia
Endangered plants
Taxonomy articles created by Polbot